The 2017 Samford Bulldogs football team represented Samford University in the 2017 NCAA Division I FCS football season. They were led by third-year head coach Chris Hatcher and played their home games at Seibert Stadium. They were a member of the Southern Conference (Socon). They finished the season 8–4, 6–2 in SoCon play to finish in a tie for second place. They received an at-large bid to the FCS Playoffs, where they lost to Kennesaw State in the first round.

Schedule

Game summaries

Kennesaw State

West Alabama

@ Georgia

@ Western Carolina

The Citadel

@ VMI

@ Wofford

Chattanooga

@ Mercer

East Tennessee State

Furman

FCS Playoffs

@ Kennesaw State–First Round

Ranking movements

References

Samford
Samford Bulldogs football seasons
Samford
Samford Bulldogs football